Walter Gadsby (14 April 1882 – 28 November 1961) was an English professional footballer who played as a full back in the Football League for Chesterfield.

Personal life 
Gadsby's brother Ernie was also a footballer.

Career statistics

References 

1882 births
1961 deaths
Footballers from Derbyshire
English footballers
English Football League players
Chesterfield F.C. players
Association football fullbacks